The Santa Monica Cycle Path, opened in 1900, was an 18-mile long, six-foot-wide, gravel bike lane running between the City of Santa Monica, California and downtown Los Angeles. The Santa Monica Cycle Path is referred to as Los Angeles' first bike lane.

History 
The effort to fund the Santa Monica Cycle Path began in 1896, organized and built through the efforts of Bob Lennie and Joseph Ostendorff, owners of a bicycle shop located at the corner of Fourth and Main streets.

See also 

 California Cycleway
 West Los Angeles Veloway

References 

Bike paths in Los Angeles
Cycling in Los Angeles
History of Santa Monica, California
History of Los Angeles
History of Los Angeles County, California